Daniel "Danny" Parker (born June 2, 1988) is a professional American songwriter. He has co-written modern pop songs for artists including Nick Jonas, Shawn Mendes, Jessie Ware, and James Blunt.

Songwriting discography

References

1988 births
Living people
American male songwriters
Place of birth missing (living people)